Woolage Village is a former mining village situated midway between Canterbury and Dover in the English county of Kent. It is 1 mile (1.6 km) to the east of the A2 road. Together with Womenswold and Woolage Green, it forms Womenswold parish.

It consists of approximately 52 semi-detached houses built in 1912, to house miners and their families working at the nearby Snowdown Colliery. The village shop and post office was shut in the 1990s and converted to a dwelling.

External links

 Womenswold Parish Council

Villages in Kent
Mining communities in England